The Islamic Azad University, Rasht Branch is an Iranian university in Rasht, Gīlān Province. It was founded on 1 September 1982.

Chancellors 
Chancellors of The Islamic Azad University of Rasht.

Vice-Chansellors 
 Dr. Alireza Seydavi (Research)
 Dr. Shahram Gholamrezaei (Education)
 Ghasem Ghasemi (Student)
 Dr. Soheil Shokri (Financial & Planning)

Schools and Departments 
 Management and Accounting
 Basic Science
 Nursing and Midwifery
 Agriculture Science
 Engineering
 Human Science

Faculty members in Google Scholar 
 Dr Shahab Shariati
 Alireza Amirteimoori
 Hossein Fallah-Bagher-Shaidaei
 All members in Google Scholar

Journals 
 Iranian Journal of Optimization (DOAJ), BASE, 
 Iranian Journal of Applied Animal Science
 International Journal of Agricultural Management and Development
 Journal of ornamental  plants
 مطالعات برنامه ریزی سکونتگاههای انسانی

Islamic Azad University, Rasht Branch in International Ranking institutions 
IAU Rasht in Scopus
IAU Rasht in Google Scholar
IAU Rasht in Webometrics

References 

 Islamic Azad University, Rasht Branch

External links 
 

Educational institutions established in 1982
Education in Gilan Province
Rasht
1982 establishments in Iran
Buildings and structures in Gilan Province